Jolliffe Lownes (died 1627) was an English apothecary who served the royal family.

Lownes was apothecary to Prince Charles. A bill from 1619 details perfumes, sweet powder and damask powder, supplied to the prince's servants, barber, and barge men. A similar bill for 1622 includes the perfuming of rooms at Nonsuch Palace and Denmark House, now known as Somerset House. The second bill is also for Prince Charles, not King James. Both bills were checked and certified by Robert Cary and the physician John Craig. Lownes also received an allowance for travel and lodging in the Prince's service, of £5 annually, paid by Adam Newton.

Lownes had professional difficulties in February 1616 when a supplier, Michael Eason, was found to be supplying inferior materials. Eason had sold Lownes "defective Apothecarie wares" which were "unwholesome for a man's body".

As apothecary to Prince Charles, Lownes sailed to Spain in 1623 during the visit known as the Spanish Match.

After Lownes died in 1627 his post was given to John Wolfgang Rumler.

References

External links
 'Scent bottle and account of the Prince's Apothecary', National Galleries of Scotland 

1627 deaths
English apothecaries
Herbalists